Nordre Land Idrettslag is a Norwegian sports club from Dokka, Nordre Land, Oppland. It has sections for association football, team handball, Nordic skiing, biathlon, cycling, equestrianism, swimming, judo, gymnastics, and track and field. It was founded in 1912.

The men's football team plays in the Fourth Division, the fourth tier of Norwegian football. It had a spell in the 3. divisjon running from 2008 to 2013.

List of known people
 Rune Brattsveen, biathlete
 Hans Vinjarengen, skier (deceased)
 Ole Kolterud, skier (deceased)
 Sverre Kolterud, skier (deceased)
 Joachim Sørum, footballer
 Olav Dalen, footballer

References

Official site 

Football clubs in Norway
Association football clubs established in 1912
Sport in Oppland
Athletics clubs in Norway
Nordre Land
1912 establishments in Norway